KRWC (1360 AM) is a radio station licensed to serve Buffalo, Minnesota, United States.  The station is owned by Donnell, Inc.

History
The station signed on in November 1971.  The station used to sign off at sunset, but switched to 24 hour broadcasting on New Years Day, 2000.  The station is a former member of the Minnesota Twins radio network.  Since KMOM 1070 AM in Monticello, MN went off the air, KRWC is the only radio station in Wright County, MN.

Programming
KRWC broadcasts a full-service format to Wright County and the greater St. Cloud, Minnesota, area. The station broadcasts oldies and both classic and contemporary  country music, as well as local news, weather, and sports.  The station broadcasts NBC Radio News updates at the top of the hour, as well as content from the Minnesota News Network and Linder Farm Network. Overnight, the station broadcasts the Jim Bohannon Show, as well as other syndicated morning programs.

On weekends, the station broadcasts a variety of different content, including local talent on Saturday from 6 to 10 AM, The Jim Bob Sports Jamboree with columnist Bob Sansevere, former Minnesota Vikings player Chuck Foreman, and Jim Rich, When Radio Was, a locally produced Bluegrass music program titled "Inside Bluegrass", and other programs.  On Sunday mornings, the station airs a variety of worship programs, including a local church service.

KRWC Radio also broadcasts local sporting events for the communities of Wright County.

They also currently air NASCAR races from the Motor Racing Network, as well as Minnesota Golden Gophers sports.

References

External links

Radio stations in St. Cloud, Minnesota
Radio stations established in 1972
News and talk radio stations in the United States
Oldies radio stations in the United States
Country radio stations in the United States
Wright County, Minnesota